Anna Kalinskaya was the defending champion having won the previous edition in 2019, but chose not to participate.

Clara Burel won the title, defeating Alexandra Dulgheru in the final, 6–2, 1–6, 6–2.

Seeds

Draw

Finals

Top half

Bottom half

References

Main Draw

Engie Open Saint-Gaudens Occitanie - Singles